The 1899 North Dakota Flickertails football team was an American football team that represented University of North Dakota during the 1899 college football season. The team compiled a 6–0 record and outscored opponents by a total of 179 to 5. 

The team was led by first-year head coach Harry C. "Babe" Loomis. Loomis was the school's first paid football coach, receiving $200 for the season. 

The team captain was Lynn Frazier who later served as Governor of North Dakota from 1817 to 1921. Another player William Nuessle became chief justice of the North Dakota Supreme Court.  A third, William Lemke, served as Attorney General of North Dakota from 1921 to 1922.

Schedule

References

External links
 Photograph of 1899 North Dakota football team

North Dakota
North Dakota Fighting Hawks football seasons
College football undefeated seasons
North Dakota Flickertails football